The Triumph of Bacchus is a painting by the Walloon artist Michaelina Wautier. It was painted between 1650 and 1656 and is considered one of Wautier's greatest works, as well as one of her largest. Based on classical texts, the picture shows a procession with the drunken god Bacchus at its centre, surrounded by other humans, satyrs and animals.

It was possibly commissioned to be part of the large collection of art amassed by Archduke Leopold Willhelm; in any case by 1659 it was noted in an inventory of the collection. 

It now hangs in the Kunsthistoriches Museum, Vienna.

References 

Paintings by Michaelina Wautier
1650s paintings
Paintings of Bacchus